Luisium is a palace and landscape garden in Dessau-Roßlau, Germany. It is a part of Dessau-Wörlitz Garden Realm, a UNESCO World Heritage Site.
In 1774 work started on a small palace in the style of an English country house, which Leopold III, Duke of Anhalt-Dessau built for his wife Margravine Louise of Brandenburg-Schwedt, thus the name Luisium.

External links

 Luisium at www.dessau.de

Palaces in Saxony-Anhalt
Museums in Saxony-Anhalt
Dessau-Roßlau